Israel Dean O'Quinn (born March 5, 1980) is an American politician. A Republican, he was elected to the Virginia House of Delegates in 2011. He  the 5th district, made up of the cities of Bristol and Galax, Grayson County, and parts of Smyth and Washington counties in the southwestern part of the state.

Early life, education, business career
O'Quinn graduated from Patrick Henry High School; he went on to receive a B.A. degree in political science and history from Emory and Henry College in 2002. After graduation, he worked in the office of the Attorney General of Virginia, Jerry Kilgore, and on several political campaigns. In 2006, he was hired by K-VA-T Food Stores, owners of the K-VA-T Food City regional supermarket chain, and currently serves as Director of the company's Office of Strategic Initiatives, in addition to chairing the company's Energy Conservation Committee.

O'Quinn is married to Emily Lauren Gentry, a corporate communications professional.

House of Delegates

In 2011, O'Quinn ran for the 5th district nomination when the incumbent, C. W. Carrico, decided to run for the state senate. He defeated independent candidate Michael D. Osborne in the general election, with 12,166 votes to 5,338. In 2019, Osborne challenged O'Quinn for the Republican nomination for the 5th district, citing concerns with a casino proposed in Bristol and tolls on Interstate 81. O'Quinn introduced legislation in January 2019 that would allow residents of Bristol to vote in a referendums to allow  a proposed casino to open and operate in the former Bristol Mall. O'Quinn defeated Osborne, with 2,449 votes to 721. O'Quinn ran unopposed in the November general election.

Electoral history

Notes

External links

1980 births
Living people
Republican Party members of the Virginia House of Delegates
Emory and Henry College alumni
Politicians from Abingdon, Virginia
21st-century American politicians